Ri Song-jin (born 11 August 1989) is a Korean handball player for the Korean national team.

He represented Korea at the 2019 World Men's Handball Championship.

References

1989 births
Living people
Korean male handball players